The men's football tournament at the 2010 Asian Games was held in Guangzhou in China from 8 to 25 November.

Squads

Results
All times are China Standard Time (UTC+08:00)

Pool matches

Group A

Group B

Group C

Group D

Group E

Group F

Third-placed teams

Knockout round

1/8 finals

Quarterfinals

Semifinals

Bronze medal match

Final

Goalscorers

Final standing

References
Results on RSSSF

External links
Official website

Men